Mark Ferguson (born 1961) is an Australian actor and television presenter.

Mark Ferguson may also refer to:

 Mark Ferguson (cricketer) (born 1981), Hong Kong cricketer
 Mark Ferguson (footballer) (born 1960), English footballer
 Mark Ferguson (handballer) (born 1990), Irish handball player
 Mark Ferguson (news presenter) (born 1966), Australian news presenter
 Mark D. Ferguson (born 1986), Scottish film director and screenwriter
 Mark E. Ferguson III (born 1956), US Navy admiral